Knockan is a township of six crofts in the community of Ardtun, in the south of the Isle of Mull off the west coast of Scotland.

The cottage called "Knockan" is distinguished by its bright red roof and white walls, set by a small hill; cnocan in Gaelic means "little hill". The cottage is around 200 years old and was originally built by a weaver of the local crofting community. It is now owned by his descendants, the family of Donald Black. The other crofting cottages in the "township" of Knockan include "Knockan House" and "Rhudda na Cruban"

Knockan is situated on an unclassified road, north of its junction with the A849. The A849 is the main route across southern Mull, travelling from Salen to Fionnphort, via Craignure.

References

External links

 Blackshouse - The Knockan Blacks (archive.org) Detailed linear case study of one Mull family from before the Highland clearances to the present day.

Villages on the Isle of Mull